Corey Hertzog (born August 1, 1990) is an American professional soccer player who plays as a forward for Union Omaha in USL League One.

Career

College and amateur
Hertzog attended Antietam Middle Senior H.S. scoring 107 career goals before enrolling at the Pennsylvania State University in 2008. He started 5 games and played in 17 his first year. In 2009, during his second year he played in all 22 games for the Nittany Lions, starting 17 and notching a team-high 11 goals. His performance in his third year led him to receive national attention by Major League Soccer. In 2010, he was the NCAA leader in goals (20), points (46), and points per game (2.09).

Hertzog played with Reading United in the USL Premier Development League during his 2010 collegiate off-season.

Professional
On December 22, 2010, Hertzog announced his intention to forgo his senior year at Penn State and become eligible for the 2011 MLS SuperDraft. He also announced that he signed a Generation Adidas contract. Generation Adidas is a joint venture between Major League Soccer and U.S. Soccer aimed at raising the level of young soccer talent in the United States. According to Soccer By Ives, Philadelphia Union tried to sign Hertzog to a Homegrown Player contract but were unsuccessful. Instead Hertzog decided to enter the draft. He was drafted 13th overall in the 2011 MLS SuperDraft by New York Red Bulls. He made his professional debut on March 26, 2011, in a 0–0 draw with Columbus Crew On June 28, 2011, in his first start for New York, Hertzog scored his first goal for the club in a 2–1 victory over FC New York in the US Open Cup.

Hertzog was loaned to third division side Wilmington Hammerheads in May 2012. On June 2, 2012, he scored two goals to lead his new club to a 3–1 victory over Orlando City SC. He ended the season as one of USL Pro's top scorers and helped the club reach the league final. On November 19, 2012, the Red Bulls announced it declined options for an additional six players, having released four a week earlier, with Hertzog included in the mix.

Hertzog signed with Vancouver Whitecaps FC on January 23, 2013, and scored his first goal for the club on April 6, 2013, against the San Jose Earthquakes. After a bright start, Hertzog's first-team chances became fewer, as a result Hertzog was loaned to NASL club FC Edmonton for their Fall season. Hertzog was released by Vancouver and selected by Seattle Sounders FC in the 2013 MLS Re-Entry Draft, but didn't sign with the club. He joined USL Pro club Orlando City on February 11, 2014. He was released upon the conclusion of the 2014 season, a casualty of the club's transition to Major League Soccer.

Days later, Hertzog signed with Tampa Bay Rowdies of the North American Soccer League (NASL) on a contract through 2015 with a club option for the 2016 season. At the end of the 2015 season, the club declined to extend a club contract option for Hertzog and six other players.

On January 6, 2016, Hertzog and Rowdies teammate Zak Boggs signed with the Pittsburgh Riverhounds.

On December 11, 2017, Hertzog signed with Saint Louis FC after two seasons with the Riverhounds.

On February 13, 2019, Hertzog signed for USL side Reno 1868. Reno folded their team on November 6, 2020, due to the financial impact of the COVID-19 pandemic.

On December 10, 2020, Hertzog signed for USL side San Diego Loyal, and scored in their season opening game.

Hertzog played with Des Moines Menace during the 2022 U.S. Open Cup.

In April 2022, Hertzog signed with Hartford Athletic of the USL Championship. Hartford and Hertzog mutually terminated his contract with the club on August 2, 2022.

Hertzog signed with USL League One club Union Omaha on August 2, 2022. The move reunited Hertzog with coaches Jay Mims and Bob Warming who he had played under while at Penn State.

Honors

Individual
 USL All-League Second Team: 2016

References

External links
 Tampa Bay Rowdies profile
 
 Penn State bio

1990 births
Living people
American soccer players
American expatriate soccer players
Penn State Nittany Lions men's soccer players
Reading United A.C. players
New York Red Bulls players
Wilmington Hammerheads FC players
Vancouver Whitecaps FC players
FC Edmonton players
Orlando City SC (2010–2014) players
Tampa Bay Rowdies players
Soccer players from Pennsylvania
Sportspeople from Reading, Pennsylvania
Expatriate soccer players in Canada
USL League Two players
Major League Soccer players
USL Championship players
North American Soccer League players
USL League One players
New York Red Bulls draft picks
Pittsburgh Riverhounds SC players
Association football forwards
Saint Louis FC players
Reno 1868 FC players
San Diego Loyal SC players
Des Moines Menace players
Hartford Athletic players
Union Omaha players